The 35th World Orienteering Championships were held in Latvia in August 2018. The hosts were Riga, Sigulda and Turaida.

Schedule

Medal summary

Medal table

Men

Women

Mixed

References

External links
Official website 

World Orienteering Championships
2018 in Latvian sport
International sports competitions hosted by Latvia
Sports competitions in Riga
World Orienteering Championships
Orienteering in Latvia
2018 in orienteering